The SNIA Emerald Program Power Efficiency Measurement Specification, is a storage specification developed and maintained by the Storage Networking Industry Association (SNIA) and cross-referenced by the Environmental Protection Agency’s EnergyStar program. The specification consists of a storage types taxonomy, system under test workload and energy measurement method, measured metrics for active and idle operational states, and presence tests for capacity optimization  technologies. The measured metric data is generated through the use of well-defined standard testing and data reduction procedures prescribed in the SNIA Emerald Specification.

SNIA's ongoing collaboration with the EPA has helped to shape the Energy Star Data Center Storage (DCS) Specification. The EPA DCS specification cross-references the SNIA Emerald Specification as the test and measurement methodology.

References

Links 

SNIA Emerald™ Program homepage provides information on power efficiency, product measurement results, training, etc. for storage systems Welcome to SNIA Emerald | SNIA
SNIA Green Storage Initiative homepage provides information about energy efficiency and conservations for networked storage technologies www.snia.org/gsi
European Code of Conduct for Energy Efficiency in Data Centre Code of Conduct for Energy Efficiency in Data Centres 
The Green Grid homepage – energy efficient IT The Green Grid
80 PLUS homepage and information about power supply energy efficiency CLEAResult Plug Load Solutions
Transaction Processing Performance Council – includes power efficiency data TPC-Homepage V5
Storage Performance Council – includes Energy Extension  
Standard Performance Evaluation Corporation – benchmarks for servers and other computer systems that include power efficiency

Third Party References to SNIA Emerald  

EnergyStar references to SNIA Emerald Specification in Table 4 Data Center Storage Key Product Criteria
Industry report reference to SNIA Emerald on Page 21  
Lot 9 study for EU, ICT best practices and procurement - reference to SNIA Emerald on Page 22 
Industry report and recommendation for ICT procurement directed at EMEA/EU - references to SNIA Emerald on Pages 10&11

Related Industry Standards 

	INCITS/ANSI ITS 39 
	ISO/IEC SC 39 ISO/IEC JTC 1/SC 39 - Sustainability, IT & Data Centres

Environmental certification marks
Cloud storage